Dana Ranga (born 1964 in Bucharest) is a Romanian writer and film director, currently living and working in Berlin.

Life 
Dana Ranga was born in 1964 in Bucharest. Initially, she studied medicine at the Carol Davila University of Medicine and Pharmacy. After she left for Berlin, she studied journalism, art history and film theory at the Free University Berlin. She now works in Berlin as a filmmaker, author and poet. 
Her debut production East Side Story (1997) received an award at the Marseille Festival of Documentary Film in 1998. The documentary film Story (2003), about astronaut Story Musgrave received awards at the film festivals in Marseille (2003), Leipzig (2003) and Houston (2004). Afterwards, Dana Ranga produced the documentary Cosmonaut Polyakov (2007), part two of the space trilogy. This film won the international feature-length competition at the It's All True / É Tudo Verdade documentary film festival in São Paulo, Brazil and the first prize at the Ciencia e Cinema festival in A Coruña, Spain, both in 2008. The space trilogy was completed in 2012 with "I Am in Space", an essay about psychology and space flight, featuring videos filmed by French ESA astronaut Jean-François Clervoy.

Filmography 
 1997: East Side Story (director, script)
 2003: Story (director, script)
 2007: Cosmonaut Polyakov (director, script, cut)
 2009: Oh, Adam (director, script, cut)
 2012: I Am in Space (director, script, cut)

Awards 
 2014: Adelbert von Chamisso Prize

External links 

 Article in Filmmagazin Manifest
 Article in Die Zeit
 Dana Ranga and Good Idea Films

1964 births
Living people
Romanian film directors
Romanian women film directors
Romanian writers
Romanian poets